St John the Baptist Church is in Liverpool Road North, Burscough, Lancashire, England.  It is an active Anglican parish church in the deanery of Ormskirk, the archdeaconry of Warrington, and the diocese of Liverpool.  Its benefice has been united with those of St Andrew, Burscough Bridge, St Cyprian, Burscough Bridge, and Oaks, Burscough Bridge.  The church is recorded in the National Heritage List for England as a designated Grade II* listed building.  It was a Commissioners' church, having received a grant towards its construction from the Church Building Commission.

History
The church was built between 1829 and 1832 to a design by Daniel Stewart.  A grant of £3,040 (equivalent to £ in ) was given towards its construction by the Church Building Commission.  The total cost of its construction of the church was £3,440.  Galleries were inserted on three sides in 1857.  In 1887–89 the chancel was added by William Waddington and Sons, and in about 1932 the south vestry was built.

Architecture
St John's is constructed in ashlar sandstone, with a slate roof.  Its architectural style is Gothic Revival.  The plan consists of a five-bay nave, and a chancel with a vestry to the south.  The west front is gabled, and is divided into three bays by four polygonal buttresses that rise to octagonal embattled turrets.  On the apex of the gable is a bellcote with louvred bell openings over which are gablets.  It has an ogival top surmounted by a crocketed pinnacle.  In the centre bay is an arched doorway, above which is a blind three-light window.  In each lateral bay is a blind two-light window.  The bays along the sides of the church are divided by buttresses, and each contains a two-light window.  On the corners of the chancel are turrets, its side windows have two lights, and the east window has five lights.

Regular services
Church services are held weekly on a Sunday at 9am, 11am and 7pm. There is also a midweek service at 10.30am each Tuesday.

See also
Grade II* listed buildings in Lancashire
Listed buildings in Burscough
List of Commissioners' churches in Northeast and Northwest England

References

External links
St John the Baptist, Burscough – church website

Grade II* listed churches in Lancashire
Church of England church buildings in Lancashire
Anglican Diocese of Liverpool
19th-century Church of England church buildings
Gothic Revival church buildings in England
Gothic Revival architecture in Lancashire
Commissioners' church buildings
Churches in the Borough of West Lancashire
St John the Baptist Church